The Mutants is the name of a fictional street gang appearing in American comic books published by DC Comics. While the Mutants were first seen in The Dark Knight Returns, there were other incarnations of the Mutants that appeared in later Batman comics.

Fictional team biography

The Dark Knight Returns
In the pages of The Dark Knight Returns, the Mutants are a youth gang that was formed sometime after Bruce Wayne retired as Batman. When the Mutants cause trouble in Gotham City at the time when crime is at an all-time high, Bruce Wayne becomes Batman again. Following his fight with Two-Face, Batman fights the Mutants. Although Batman defeats the Mutants with his advanced weaponry in the ensuing battle, the Mutant Leader ends up goading him into a fight. During their hand-to-hand brawl, Batman, despite being able to match the Leader in strength, is rusty and slightly slow due to a decade's lack of activity which results in him getting seriously injured. Carrie Kelley creates a diversion, allowing Batman to immobilize the Mutant Leader, and the two of them escape. The Gotham City Police Department arrive and arrest the Mutant Leader and those with him. While in police custody, the Mutant Leader is visited by the unnamed Mayor of Gotham City who wants to negotiate with him. This ends with the Mutant Leader killing the mayor by tearing out his throat causing Deputy Mayor Stevenson to be sworn in as the new Mayor of Gotham City. Assisting in Batman's plan, Gordon has the Mutant Leader released while Carrie spreads the word of a showdown between Batman and the Mutant Leader. The two engage in a fight at a sewage run-off pipe surrounded by members of the Mutant gang. Leveraging the mud from the sewage to slow him down, Batman deals the Leader a brutal defeat. Seeing Batman defeat their leader, the Mutants disband and some of them come together as a group called the Sons of Batman, using excessive violence against criminals, while others splinter off into gangs such as the Nixons and Bruno's gang.

Mainstream comics
The mainstream version of the Mutants were seen causing trouble until they fight Dick Grayson as Batman and Damian Wayne as Robin.

In 2011, "The New 52" rebooted the DC Universe. The Mutants are seen taking place in a smuggling operation conducted by Leviathan. They were defeated by Batman Incorporated.

When Booster Gold accidentally brought Jonah Hex to the present, he finds a family being endangered by the Mutants led by King-Boss-Champion Steaktube. He manages to shoot them until the police and Batwing arrive. After getting out of Arkham Asylum using Amadeus Arkham's great-grandson Jeremiah Arkham as a hostage, they steal a car and come across a GCPD checkpoint where both groups are attacked by the Mutants. Jonah Hex takes some guns from the downed police officers and starts to fight the Mutants in a gunfight.

Members

The Dark Knight Returns
  – The unnamed albino leader of the Mutants.
 Don – 
 Rob –

Mainstream comics
 King-Boss-Champion Steaktube – Member of the Mutants. Killed by Jonah Hex.

In other media

Television
 The Mutants appear in The New Batman Adventures episode "Legends of the Dark Knight" with the Mutant Leader voiced by Kevin Michael Richardson, Don voiced by Mark Rolston, and Rob voiced by Charles Rocket.
 In the Teen Titans episode "How Long is Forever?," two members of the Mutants gang are shown throwing snowballs at an elderly Beast Boy in a cage.
 The Mutants appear in Batman: The Brave and the Bold. In the episode "The Knights of Tomorrow!," the Mutants are seen robbing a bank in a future where Bruce Wayne's son Damian is the new Batman with Damian's son as the new Robin. It turns out that the events of the episode were all part of a book that Alfred Pennyworth was writing.
 A variation of the Mutants appears in Gotham. The Mutants are known to hold fight clubs across Gotham City. In the episode "Wrath of the Villains: This Ball of Mud and Meanness," Bruce Wayne and Alfred Pennyworth meet with their leader Terence "Cupcake" Shaw (portrayed by Jamar Greene) who agreed to give them information on how to find his old partner Matches Malone. He agreed to do so if Alfred fights him. After turning down Bruce's suggestion to pay off Terence, Alfred agrees to fight Terence. After being defeated by Alfred, Terence directs them to Jeri at the Celestial Gardens as she knows where Malone was last sighted. In the episode "Penguin, Our Hero," another faction of Mutants appear inhabiting the posh area of Gotham City that has been labeled the Dark Zone after Gotham City was declared No Man's Land. Bruce Wayne and Selina Kyle encounter the Mutants and their unnamed leader (portrayed by Sid O'Connell) while looking for Jeremiah Valeska. While Bruce fought the members of the Mutants, Selina took on the Mutant Leader. After Bruce defeated most of the Mutants, he prevented Selina from finishing off the Mutant Leader. When Bruce asks if he has sighted Jeremiah Valeska, the Mutant Leader states that he was last seen at the Old Town Church. The Mutant Leader then reappeared in "The Trial of Jim Gordon" where he was hypnotized by Ivy Pepper and used as a distraction to fight Selina while Ivy hypnotized Bruce. Selina though managed to subdue the Mutant Leader again.
 The Mutants appear in the pilot episode of Gotham Knights. They are seen rioting in the Narrows which is covered in a news report in light of Bruce Wayne's death and the discovery that he was Batman.

Film
 The Mutants appear in the two-part film Batman: The Dark Knight Returns with the Mutant Leader voiced by Gary Anthony Williams, Don voiced by Dee Bradley Baker, Rob voiced by Rob Paulsen, and the Sons of Batman member voiced by Yuri Lowenthal.
 The Mutant Leader appears in The Lego Batman Movie. He is among the villains assembled by Joker to attack Gotham City.
 The Mutants make a cameo at the end of Zack Snyder's Justice League, briefly shown tied up as Batman stands on top of the Batmobile.

References

External links
 Mutants (The Dark Knight Returns version) at DC Comics Wiki
 Mutants (New Earth) at DC Comics Wiki
 Mutants at Comic Vine

Batman characters
Characters created by Frank Miller (comics)
Comics characters introduced in 1986
DC Comics metahumans
DC Comics supervillain teams
Fictional gangs